Arvid Martin Hjalmar Lönnroth (11 September 1856 in Kungälv, Bohuslän – 24 July 1935 in Göteborg) was a sailor from Sweden, who represented his native country at the 1908 Summer Olympics in Ryde, Isle of Wight, Great Britain in the 8 Metre.

Further reading

References

1856 births
1917 deaths
People from Kungälv Municipality
Sailors at the 1908 Summer Olympics – 8 Metre
Swedish male sailors (sport)
Olympic sailors of Sweden
Sportspeople from Västra Götaland County